Angraecum didieri is a species of flowering plant in the Orchidaceae family.

References

didieri
Taxa named by Henri Ernest Baillon
Taxa named by Achille Eugène Finet
Taxa named by Rudolf Schlechter